Barbara J. Griffiths was the US Ambassador to Iceland from September 10, 1999. to 2002.

Griffiths was born on August 1, 1949, and is a native of Verona, New Jersey, where she graduated from Verona High School. She received a B.A. degree in economics from Montclair State College in New Jersey, and an M.A. degree in economics from the University of Connecticut. She has studied French, Russian, German and Spanish, and Icelandic.

Griffiths began her career in the U.S. Foreign Service in 1977. From 1996 to 1999 she was Deputy Assistant Secretary of State for Economic and Business Affairs at the Department of State in Washington, D.C. Prior to that she was Minister Counselor for Economic Affairs at the U.S. Embassies in Seoul and Moscow. She held previous assignments in Washington, Mexico City and Ottawa.

References

Living people
Ambassadors of the United States to Iceland
20th-century American diplomats
21st-century American diplomats
American women ambassadors
People from Verona, New Jersey
Verona High School (New Jersey) alumni
1949 births
Montclair State University alumni
University of Connecticut alumni